East Street in a street located in Fremantle, Western Australia.  It runs between High Street and Beach Street on the southern shore of the Swan River.  The intersection with High Street is at the north east corner of the Monument Hill reserve. It also intersects with Ellen Street and Burt Street on its western side.

It crosses Canning Highway before a steep drop to the level of Beach Street.

Located on the western side of the street is the John Curtin College of the Arts
The cutting and its edges at the southern end of the street has required maintenance over time.
The Swan River end of the street, a jetty known locally as the East Street Jetty, has been the location for a number of events.

Intersections

Notes

 
Streets in Fremantle